David Girardi  is an American football coach who is the quarterbacks coach for the Kansas City Chiefs of the National Football League (NFL).

Playing career
Girardi played at Geneva between 2007 and 2010. He started 3 years and finished with 5,997 passing yards and 37 touchdowns with a 5.72 completion precentege. He was inducted into  the Geneva College Athletics Hall of Fame in 2022.

Coaching career

College
Giraradi starterd out as a graduate assistant at Seton Hill. Then he became the Quarterbacks coach at his alma mater Geneva. Then he coached at Northwestern from 2014 to 2017 as an Offensive quality control coach and Defensive graduate assistant. After that he was named the Quarterbacks coach for Lafayette where he coached for one year in 2018.

Kansas City Chiefs
On January 29, 2018, the Chiefs hired Girardi as an Offensive quality control coach. In 2021 he was promoted to Assistant quarterbacks coach and Passing game analyst. On February 28, 2023, the Chiefs again promoted Girardi but this time to Quarterbacks Coach.

References

Living people
American football quarterbacks
Kansas City Chiefs coaches
Northwestern Wildcats football coaches
Lafayette Leopards football coaches